The 55th Dan Kolov & Nikola Petrov Tournament,  was a sport wrestling event held in  Ruse, Bulgaria between 7 and 9 April 2017.

This international tournament includes competition in both men's and women's freestyle wrestling and men's Greco-Roman wrestling. This tournament is held in honor of Dan Kolov who was the first European freestyle wrestling champion from Bulgaria and  European and World Champion Nikola Petroff.

Event videos
The event was air freely on the Bulgarian Wrestling Federation Live YouTube channel.

Medal table

Medal overview

Men's freestyle

Greco-Roman

Women's freestyle

Participating nations

413 competitors from 40 nations participated.
 (1)
 (13)
 (13)
 (4)
 (61)
 (1)
 (1)
 (12)
 (7)
 (13)
 (12)
 (8)
 (1)
 (16)
 (25)
 (7)
 (3)
 (9)
 (3)
 (44)
 (12)
 (24)
 (1)
 (1)
 (7)
 (3)
 (4)
 (17)
 (22)
 (9)
 (1)
 (1)
 (4)
 (9)
 (12)
 (16)
 (44)
 (32)
 (1)

References 

2017 in European sport
2017 in sport wrestling
April 2017 sports events in Europe
2017 in Bulgarian sport